Roberto Silva may refer to:

Roberto Silva Renard (1855-1920), Chilean military figure
Roberto Silva (athlete) (born 1947), Mexican runner
Roberto Silva (Peruvian footballer) (born 1976), Peruvian footballer
Roberto Silva (Portuguese footballer) (born 1982), Portuguese footballer
Roberto Andrade Silva (born 1988), Brazilian footballer
Roberto Mendes Silva (born 1979), Brazilian footballer